Firestar (Angelica "Angel" Jones) is a superhero appearing in media and American comic books published by Marvel Comics. Created by Dennis Marks, Dan Spiegle, Christy Marx, John Romita Sr., and Rick Hoberg, the character first appeared in 1981 on the NBC animated television series Spider-Man and His Amazing Friends.

Firestar has the ability to generate and manipulate microwave radiation, allowing her to fly and create intense heat and flames. In the comics, she has acted as a solo hero and also as a member of the Hellions, New Warriors, Avengers, and X-Men.

Development and publication history

Spider-Man and His Amazing Friends

Firestar - spelled as Fire-Star - was created for the NBC animated series Spider-Man and His Amazing Friends, with Kathy Garver providing her voice. This version of the character has the ability to control heat in all its forms, as stated in the 1981 "Spider-Man and His Amazing Friends" one-shot comic.

The creators had wanted to use the Human Torch, but the rights to the character were tied up. Fire-Star's pre-production names included Heatwave, Starblaze, and Firefly. Dennis Marks, one of the original writers of Spider-Man and His Amazing Friends, stated in a 2002 interview that he had come up with the name of Fire-Star's alias, Angelica Jones, taken from one of his old girlfriends.

In the series, Fire-Star is identified as a former member of the X-Men, along with Iceman with whom she occasionally appears to have a playful flirtation and sometimes dates. At times, she dates Peter Parker (Spider-Man) as well, resulting in a relaxed love triangle of sorts (though Iceman states that "fire and ice don't really mix" despite having feelings for each other). Fire-Star also has a one-episode romance with Sunfire.

Her origin is explained in "A Fire-Star is Born." Young Angelica Jones was subject to constant bullying by another girl named Bonnie who called her "Miss Angelica Jinx" due mainly to events mysteriously happening (triggered by her powers) whenever Angelica was around. It was during this time that she became aware of her powers, once saving her father from an accident while disguised.

Early in her senior year of high school, Bonnie and her boyfriend framed Angelica for the theft of a trophy, causing Dean Wilmer to temporarily suspend Angelica from school. A strong need to correct this situation led Angelica to become Fire-Star for the first time. She found proof of Bonnie's deception, retrieved the missing trophy, and compelled Bonnie to confess, which justified their expulsion from school. She was later approached by Cyclops, Angel, and Iceman to join the X-Men. She accepted and was seen helping them against Magneto and the Sentinels.

The animated series and the one-shot Spider-Man and His Amazing Friends comic book (which adapted an episode for print) are not considered part of standard Marvel Universe continuity. However, the 2006 one-shot comic Spider-Man Family: Amazing Friends (August 2006) features an in-continuity story, "Opposites Attack!", in which the three superheroes work as a short-lived team. This story takes place shortly after the up-and-coming hero Firestar becomes a founding member of the New Warriors.

Firestar mini-series

Firestar's first in-continuity comic book appearance was in Uncanny X-Men #193. She next appeared in her own mini-series, which presented her definitive, in-continuity origin. The Firestar four issue mini-series depicts events both before and after Firestar's appearance in Uncanny X-Men #193, showing her development from a shy, insecure girl afraid of her developing powers to a confident young woman capable of easily defeating Emma Frost.

The mini-series also established that Firestar's powers were microwave-based, rather than the more common fire-generation power that her animated counterpart displayed; the comic-book Firestar essentially harnesses ambient microwave radiation from her environment, making her powers far stronger in an environment such as space, where the concentration of microwaves is much greater than within a planetary atmosphere.

Established character
Despite the mini-series' efforts to flesh out the character, Firestar was not featured in any stories for a few years and seemed destined to fade into obscurity until she joined the New Warriors. She would go on to appear as a regular character in Avengers, and the informal all-female team "Marvel Divas".

After the special Firestar one-shot issue (April 2010), Firestar returned to full-time superheroics as a character in the short-lived comic series Young Allies. Firestar appears as a main character in the I Am an Avenger comic book mini-series.

Firestar was one of the feature characters in the 2011 six-issue limited series Fear Itself: Youth in Revolt.

At the 2013 San Diego Comic Con, Firestar was announced "to take her place as a major X-Men character for the first time" starring in the new comic book Amazing X-Men in November 2013.

Fictional character biography

Hellions
A lonely girl raised by her single father Bartholomew and paternal grandmother, Angelica Jones discovered that she possessed mutant powers. After her grandmother's death by heart failure and her revelation that she was a mutant, her father sent Angelica to the Massachusetts Academy. The Hellfire Club's original White Queen Emma Frost began training Angelica in the use of her powers for the Hellfire Club's team of young mutants. She was never sent on field missions with the other Hellions, however, because of her lack of control over her lethal powers and because the White Queen wished to instill cruelty and callousness in Firestar's personality, and befriending other young mutants would work against that goal. The White Queen manipulated Angelica into perceiving Frost as a loving mother figure, unaware that Frost was secretly grooming her to be a potential assassin and bodyguard. Angelica did meet the New Mutants at an Academy dance and, with the White Queen's telepathic prompting, formed a crush on Cannonball.

Firestar was later emotionally manipulated by Empath, and accompanied the Hellions Thunderbird, Empath and Roulette on a mission against the X-Men, in which Thunderbird sought revenge on Xavier, thinking him responsible for his brother's death. Angelica felt terrible guilt over the incident once she was free of Empath's power, however. Professor Xavier offered her a place at the Xavier School, but although she declined out of loyalty to the White Queen, she was touched and pleased by the offer.

While a student of the Massachusetts Academy, Angelica had Hellfire mercenary Randall Chase assigned to her as a bodyguard. Growing close to Angelica, Randall eventually began to suspect the White Queen's true motives and was to be terminated. He escaped, mortally wounded, and managed to warn Angelica of Frost's duplicity just before he died. In retaliation, Jones attacked and defeated the White Queen, and decimated the hidden training complex beneath Frost's Massachusetts Academy. Afterwards, she returned to living with her father (as she was still a minor at the time) but kept the unique costume and identity of Firestar given to her by Frost.

Firestar was later to become one of the few surviving original Hellions after most members were murdered by Trevor Fitzroy. She, Warpath and Empath were the only members of the team not present during the massacre. Firestar and Warpath (accompanied by Warpath's X-Force teammate and Firestar's former love interest Cannonball), travelled to Nova Roma in Brazil to inform Empath and former New Mutant Magma of their teammates' deaths. The trio then went to the Massachusetts Academy where they removed the few remaining files on record of the Hellions' existence.

New Warriors
Shortly after her resignation from the Massachusetts Academy, Firestar became a founding member of the New Warriors when she was invited (or rather blackmailed) by Night Thrasher into joining, and helped them battle Terrax. She also aided Night Thrasher against Midnight's Fire. She also helped Thor defeat the Juggernaut alongside the New Warriors. The team battled the Mad Thinker and Primus, and then battled Psionex.

The team battled the second Star Thief and Stane International's Mandroids. With teammates Marvel Boy and Namorita, and the Star Thief, she launched into space aboard a Stane rocket. They encountered the Inhumans and the Watcher on the Moon. With the help of Black Bolt and the Star Thief, she destroyed the Stane rocket containing hazardous waste.

Back on Earth, the New Warriors battled the Force of Nature in a Brazilian jungle, and rescued teammate Speedball's mother. The New Warriors also battled the White Queen and her Hellions.

Eventually, she fell in love and became engaged to teammate Vance Astrovik (also known as Justice, formerly Marvel Boy). She later discovered that using her microwave powers could eventually render her infertile.

During a revenge scheme by a gang of thugs called the Poison Memories, Firestar's father was shot in the chest. He nearly died but recovered. Firestar also faced a time without Vance, as he had to serve a prison term for the involuntary slaying of his own abusive father.

Firestar also provided vital assistance in helping Spider-Man tackle Carnage during "Maximum Carnage", when he was also forced to ally himself with Venom, Black Cat and Morbius to stop Carnage's reign of slaughter. Her microwave power proved the only weapon truly effective against Carnage following his 'upgrade'—his vulnerability to sonics having been weakened—but she still refused to kill Carnage, even to stop his murders. For a time, she was briefly attracted to Spider-Man's clone, Ben Reilly, when he joined the New Warriors under the identity of the Scarlet Spider, but their relationship never went beyond an interest due to Firestar's engagement to Justice and Reilly's secrecy causing him to avoid revealing his identity.

Avengers
Firestar and Justice eventually left the New Warriors together. Some time later the two joined the Avengers after an alternate-universe adventure and a struggle against Morgan le Fay. Firestar helped demonstrate her fitness for the position when she and Vance took down Whirlwind, a villain that had foiled most of the other Avengers at once.

Firestar demonstrated a more restrained fashion sense, refusing to wear a cleavage-baring costume designed by the Wasp. Though she is seen wearing exactly that costume in an Avengers promo poster and in some early Avengers appearances, she quickly altered the costume to be more modest, which was consistent with her personality.

During this period, Henry Pym determined that the cause of her potential infertility was her natural immunity to the effects of her own powers (which all mutants possess) had never fully developed. He designed a costume for her that would siphon off the excess radiation, give her natural immunity the opportunity to manifest fully and heal the damage already done. After a distinguished tenure with the Avengers, including going undercover in a bizarre cult, facing a horde of Ultron robots, and struggling against Kang the Conqueror's takeover of modern-day Earth, she and Justice left the Avengers. She also made a tentative peace with Emma Frost during this time.

Angelica started college and enjoyed a "normal life", but she abandoned wedding preparations, leaving Vance with all of the responsibility. When Vance confronted her about this, she confessed that she needed more life experience before settling into married life. Vance left in anger and presumably ended their engagement.

Retirement
Firestar is one of the few mutants left on the planet with her powers intact after the Scarlet Witch altered reality and decimated the mutant population. Firestar was not among the New Warriors who died in the catastrophe that sparked the events of Civil War. She was presumed to be among the Warriors who confronted the operator of an anti-Warriors hate site created in the wake of the catastrophe, revealed to be former Warriors member Carlton LaFroyge (Hindsight Lad). She is seen flying in the background, above the confrontation.

Firestar responded to the Superhuman Registration Act by effectively retiring from her career as a costumed hero. She was seen as part of a New Warriors reunion of sorts with Nova and Justice, with whom she seems to be on good terms again.

Marvel Divas
In the limited series Marvel Divas (which was pitched as "Sex and the City in the Marvel Universe"), it is revealed Angelica's closest friends are Black Cat, Hellcat and Photon. At the very end of the first issue, Firestar announces she has been diagnosed with cancer. She's later diagnosed by Doctor Strange and the Night Nurse as being in the earlier stages of the illness, provoked seemingly by the same inability to shield herself from her microwave emission powers that's making her infertile. Despite her bravery in dealing with the illness (she asks Patsy to write a book and a blog to relay her experience to other cancer survivors, strongly believing in her ability to heal), and Henry Pym offering her a second opinion (despite Pym actually being a biochemist, and not a physician), she is still in visible distress; enough for Daimon Hellstrom to approach his ex-wife Patsy, ensuring her fast healing in exchange for Patsy remarrying him (and giving him her soul in the process). Learning about Patsy's brave move to help in her recovery, Angelica and her supportive friends travelled to Hellstrom's dimension to rescue her, thereby rejecting his 'healing' help for Hellcat's freedom and taking her chances against the cancer. After returning to Earth, Angelica had a follow-up exam that revealed her cancer to be in complete remission. During this series, she is a New York University graduate student in art history, specializing in Medieval European art. Due to her chemotherapy, Angelica began to lose her hair. Initially opting for a wig, she decided to cut her hair short instead.

One-shot and Young Allies
Firestar continues her education while engaging in super heroics part-time. In her one-shot issue, she is wearing a long-haired red wig as her natural hair has not grown back yet.

When the Bastards of Evil attack at the World Trade Center Ground Zero, she is the first of New York's heroes to respond. Shortly after, she is joined by Gravity, Nomad, Spider-Girl and Toro. The five heroes unite to defeat the menace, but are not taken seriously by the established teams (the Fantastic Four and Avengers) to arrive after the battle.

The group worked to track down the Bastards of Evil, Firestar partnering with Gravity while the others pursued independent leads. In addition to tracking the Bastards, Firestar and Gravity begin to patrol the city at night fighting street level crime. During this period, Angelica is dismissive of Nomad and Spider-Girl, which she later regrets as it wasn't that long ago that she was an adolescent super hero.

When Nomad and Spider-Girl are captured by the Bastards on their way to meet Gravity and Firestar, Angelica is able to use her microwave powers to track the Bastards and is able to drain the radiation that empowers them. With Gravity's help, she is able to expel the energy harmlessly into space. Nomad suggests that they remain together as the Young Allies, which everyone objects to, and they appear to go their separate ways.

In the final issue of Young Allies (issue #6), Emma Frost attempts to recruit Angelica to move to Utopia with the rest of the mutant population. No offer to join the X-Men was explicitly made, but as most of the mutants living in Utopia appear to be on call as needed, it can be assumed that if Firestar moved she would have been available to the team. Angelica refused the offer, eventually burning down Emma's hotel room to be left alone. Gravity and Firestar continue their evening patrols, and Frost suggests that Gravity has a romantic/sexual interest in her. He also appears to recognize her civilian identity when he sees her in a coffee shop, but she does not notice him.

The Young Allies are continuing to operate as a loosely affiliated team to fight Onslaught alongside the Secret Avengers in Onslaught Unleashed, despite the cancellation of their own series. Then Firestar appears at a meeting held by Prodigy regarding magical hammers that have crashed into the earth. She and Gravity agree to co-lead an Initiative team to help keep order during the crisis.  After Gravity is injured in a fight with Crossbones, she assumes full command until she and Prodigy travel to Las Vegas to assist with the damage control efforts after the Juggernaut's attack on the city and subsequent battle with the Heavy Hitters. Reunited with Gravity, who also went to Las Vegas to confront Heavy Hitters leader Hardball regarding civilian casualties during the fight, Firestar joined Gravity, Hardball and Telemetry on a mission to prevent seismic damage to the area. Believing they were going to die, she and Gravity revealed their secret identities to each other. Following the end of Fear Itself, Firestar has been seen with Gravity and their former Young Allies associate Spider-Girl fighting Hydro Man, indicating the group is still working together.

Firestar applied for a teaching job at the Jean Grey School of Higher Learning but when she admitted that she had a thing for Iceman she was rejected as Kitty Pryde, the headmistress of the school who was doing the interviewing, was at the time Iceman's girlfriend.

X-Men
Firestar joined the X-Men as a new teacher in the Jean Grey School assigned to teaching Physics. After being dragged to Hell with other members of the X-Men, she was pulled into a quest to search for the deceased Nightcrawler, at one point setting Hell itself on fire to stop a wave of demons attacking her and Iceman, an action that notably impressed Nightcrawler. Later on, after returning to Earth, Firestar and Iceman encountered Spider-Man.

Powers and abilities
Firestar is a mutant whose body stores ambient electromagnetic energy, which she can project and manipulate for various effects. As she alters the electromagnetic wavelengths, they form a microwave aura around her body, at which point she mentally "pushes" the microwaves away from herself. Doing this allows her to release heat, light and radiation into her environment at various intensities. By focusing microwaves on a specific target, she can cause it to burst into flames, explode or melt. She can project microwave energy blasts which have a thermo-concussive effect, heating objects to the point of melting or being incinerated, while the superheated and pressurized air created by the directed microwaves produces impact. Firestar can also sense microwave signals (such as cellular phone signals or remote-control devices) and disrupt electronics with her own microwave emissions. By superheating the air around her, Firestar can generate enough upward thrust to fly at high speeds and lift objects as heavy as the X-Man Colossus. Firestar's mutant abilities do not grant her any particular immunity to the effects of intense heat other than that generated by her own microwave powers. During training exercises with Emma Frost in her limited series, she was chastised by her teacher for clumsiness and warned that she could have been "badly burned" by a laser. During a fight between the Avengers and Fantastic Four years later, the Human Torch was afraid of burning her with his own flames. However, she eventually displayed the ability to siphon heat energy and to detect electromagnetic signatures from broadcast transmissions.

Though exposure to high levels of microwave radiation can be harmful or fatal to living beings, Firestar is apparently immune to most of the damaging effects of her powers. Unlike most mutants, her immunity to her own power was not complete; she was in danger of rendering herself sterile until a cure was discovered by Henry Pym. He designed a suit of micro-circuitry to be worn under her costume that absorbed the excess microwave energy that was affecting her cells, and diverted it in a way that would "kick start" her natural immunity to her own powers. Pym claimed it would take about six months for process to be complete, and over time Firestar appeared to be functionally immune to microwave radiation. She was later diagnosed with breast cancer which was attributed to long-term exposure to her own power. Though the cancer is in remission, the current status of her immunity is unknown.

On rare occasion, Firestar has demonstrated the ability to disrupt the psionic powers of others using her own power (namely, Emma Frost, Empath, and the Darkling). She is not immune to psychic assault, but when using microwave abilities at a high level she is capable of disrupting it. Onslaught, and the Gamesmaster, were both able to use telepathy against her effectively.

The nature of Firestar's power grants her the capacity for large-scale destruction. She typically limits how much of her own power she accesses for fear of permanently damaging the planet, its atmosphere and electromagnetic field. In space, she is far less inhibited, and can access greater levels of ambient electromagnetic energy to fuel her powers. She easily produced an attack that injured Garthan Saal when he possessed the energy of the entire Nova Corps, and also used her enhanced abilities to power a massive Shi'ar interstellar transport gate with very little effort.

Reception

Critical reception 
Deirdre Kaye of Scary Mommy called Firestar a "role model" and "truly heroic." Darren Franich of Entertainment Weekly ranked Firestar 34th in their "Let's rank every Avenger ever" list. CBR.com ranked Firestar 4th in their "10 Most Powerful Members of The New Warriors" list, 8th in their "20 Most Powerful Mutants From The '80s" list, CBR.com ranked Firestar 4th in their "10 Most Powerful Members of The New Warriors" list, and 15th in their "20 Most Powerful Female Members Of The Avengers" list.

Anthony Orland of Digital Trends called Firestar one of the "12 new Marvel characters we want to see in the Spider-Man 4 movie." Jordan Iacobucci of Screen Rant included Firestar in thei"10 Marvel Superheroes From The ‘80s Who Should Join The MCU" list, while Lukas Shayo named her one of the "10 Iconic New York City-Based Marvel Superheroes We Haven't Seen In The MCU" list.

Impact 
In July 2022, Marvel Comics announced that Firestar was the winner of the second annual X-Men fan vote.

Other versions

Spider-Verse
Appearing in Edge of Spider-Verse: Web of Fear, Spider-UK (a British Spider-Man who is a member of the Captain Britain Corps) witnesses Morlun kill Spider-Man, as well as Firestar and Iceman lying dead. This universe is an alternate version of Spider-Man and his Amazing Friends (Earth-1983).

Exiles
An alternate version of Firestar was forced to join the team known as Weapon X, a group of alternate reality-hopping super-people bound to repair broken worlds. Joining the team, Angelica was soon killed in a mega-blast unleashed by her own powers, opposing the evil Hyperion. In the process, her sacrifice also killed Spider. Because her body was reduced to ash, it was not returned to its native universe (Earth-3062).

Marvel Zombies vs. Army of Darkness
In issue #3 of this miniseries, she is shown, in flashback, to be among the reserve members of the Avengers answering Colonel America's distress signal (unaware it was a trap), and subsequently leaving the mansion (with fewer people than went in) infected and hungry for human flesh.

MC2
Firestar appeared in a flashback detailing the last adventure of the original Avengers. Firestar was among the team members who died in the team's final battle.

Mutant X
In the Mutant X Universe, Firestar's powers had evolved to the point where her entire body was composed of microwave energy. She was one of the many people trying to resist the rule of Madelyne Pryor. She, along with numerous other heroes, died in battle in the final issue of Mutant X.

Spider-Man Loves Mary-Jane
Firestar appeared in Spider-Man Loves Mary Jane. In the initial Firestar story, Mary Jane watched Spider-Man and Firestar battling crime together and became very jealous. In subsequent issues, Firestar expressed a true romantic interest in Spider-Man. The Firestar story arc took place in issues #16-20 of the series and was compiled in digest format as Spider-Man Loves Mary Jane, Vol. 4. Also, Iceman appears in a few pages of the final issue of the story arc, showcasing a rare comic-book moment in which the "Spider-Friends" are shown together.

Ultimate Marvel

Brian Michael Bendis, writer of Ultimate Spider-Man, revealed his intentions to have the Ultimate Marvel version of Firestar appear in the book in an interview on Comic Book Resources on July 20, 2007. Bendis further stated he had spent 120 issues working toward this and making it an "organic" event and not something "I pulled out of my ass".

Ultimate Firestar makes her debut in Ultimate Spider-Man #118, when Liz Allan claims to be suffering from some bizarre ailment shortly after kissing the Human Torch, and at the close of the issue catches fire while at a beach party with her friends. In the final moments of the story, Liz's body becomes a living mass of flames, signaling her transformation into what could be considered Ultimate Firestar.

The next issue (#119) deals with Liz as she tried to come to grips with her powers. The Human Torch is forced to deal with a call from the Fantastic Four, while Shadowcat is grounded, leaving only Iceman and Spider-Man able to go after Liz, an homage to the Spider-Man and His Amazing Friends television series. After some friendly banter, Magneto shows up, asking Liz to come with him so that he can take her to her biological father. Unsure of what to do, Liz goes home to confront her mother who reveals that her uncle Frank is in fact her real father. Magneto and the X-Men, summoned by Spider-Man, then show up asking Liz to side with one of them. Liz chooses neither and flees to Mary Jane's house.

Spider-Man quickly follows her there, and to convince her of his words, he reveals his true identity. She is greatly moved by this and refers to him as an "amazing friend". Swayed, Liz then thinks it might be cool to join the X-Men, leaving for the mansion alongside Iceman. The issue ends with a flashback that reveals that Liz's father is in fact the Blob. It was revealed in Ultimate X-Men #94 that Liz has chosen the codename Firestar, and has some control of her powers.

Liz Allan was believed to have been missing in action after Ultimatum, but survived and is featured in Ultimate X beginning with issue #4. In this issue, it is revealed she, her mother and her newfound half-brother Teddy (and son of the Blob) try to make a fresh start in California. She often teases Teddy because, as she says, he reminds her of her father, though her mother speculates it might be because he reminds her of what she is. When Teddy's friend kills the high school's principal, Teddy's powers manifest, and the situation goes awry. When approached by Jean Grey's Tomorrow People and Quicksilver's Brotherhood, Liz chooses to follow Jean whereas Teddy joins Quicksilver. After briefly working with the team, she settles in Tian, a safe haven for mutants, until its destruction. She then rejoins the X-Men. She also attended a small party that commemorated Peter a few years after his death with Iceman and Human Torch.

In other media

Television
 Firestar appears in Wolverine and the X-Men, voiced by Tara Strong. This version possesses fiery hair while using her powers and hails from a Mutant Response Division-dominated future.
 Firestar appears in The Super Hero Squad Show, voiced by Laura Bailey. This version is a high school student and classmate of Reptil and Amadeus Cho in her civilian identity.

Video games
 Firestar appears as an assist character in Spider-Man and Venom: Maximum Carnage.
 Firestar appears in Marvel: Ultimate Alliance 2, voiced by Kimberly Brooks. This version is an ally of Captain America in opposing the Superhuman Registration Act and appears as a mini-boss in the pro-registration campaign and as a boss in the anti-registration campaign.
 Firestar appears as a playable character in Marvel Super Hero Squad Online, voiced again by Tara Strong.

Live performances

 In 1987, Firestar appeared as a guest in Marvel Comics' live reenactment of Spider-Man's wedding to Mary Jane Watson.

Merchandise 

 Numerous items were marketed that feature Firestar. In 1994, a Firestar Real Heros cup was available at Pizza Hut. Wizard Entertainment introduced a Firestar action figure offered in Toyfare Magazine #2 in 1997. Wizkids marketed Firestar HeroClix figurines (set of 4) in November 2004. Art Asylum produced a Firestar Minimate action figure in 2005. In December 2007, Diamond Select released a 6-inch Firestar minibust. Firestar is featured on cards in the Marvel Universe Trading Cards Series 1 (1990, card #85), Series 2 (1991, cards #32 and 156), Series 3 (1992, card #174), Series 4 (1993, card #20), and Series 5 (1994, cards #20 and 73). Firestar was also included in a number of T-shirts, posters, and art prints featuring New Warriors. In 2021 Hasbro released a 6” Marvel Legends action figure of Firestar.

References

External links

 Firestar at Marvel.com
 
 UncannyXmen.net Spotlight on Firestar
 

Avengers (comics) characters
Characters created by John Romita Sr.
Comics characters introduced in 1981
Female characters in animation
Female characters in television
Fictional characters with fire or heat abilities
Marvel Comics American superheroes
Marvel Comics female superheroes
Marvel Comics mutants
Marvel Comics television characters
Spider-Man and His Amazing Friends
X-Men supporting characters